The 2018–19 NCAA Division III men's ice hockey season began on October 13, 2018, and concluded on March 23, 2019. This was the 46th season of Division III college ice hockey.

Regular season

Season tournaments

Standings

Note: Mini-game are not included in final standings

2019 NCAA Tournament

See also
 2018–19 NCAA Division I men's ice hockey season
 2018–19 NCAA Division II men's ice hockey season

References

External links

 
NCAA